103.3 Max FM (DXDN 103.3 MHz) is a Philippinan FM station owned by Rizal Memorial Colleges Broadcasting Corporation and operated by Christian Media Management. Its studios and transmitter are located at Brgy. Poblacion 1, Midsayap.

References

External links
Max FM Midsayap FB Page

Radio stations in Cotabato
Radio stations established in 2012